Tamunotonye Soipiriala Adonye Ibiama (born 29 September 1974), commonly known as Tonye Ibiama and also known as Big T is a Nigerian businessman, talent manager and record label executive based in the UK. Ibiama grew up primarily in Port Harcourt, Rivers State. He is the founder, CEO and head of Grafton Entertainment and has helped launch the careers of many famous artists including De Indispensables, M Trill, Idahams, Tha IBZ, and Mr. 2Kay.

See also

List of people from Port Harcourt

References

External links

1974 births
Nigerian entertainment industry businesspeople
Living people
Businesspeople from Port Harcourt
Nigerian music industry executives